Paul Shaw (born 4 October 1965) is an Australian former professional rugby league footballer who played in the 1980s and 1990s.  He played for Manly-Warringah and Gold Coast in the New South Wales Rugby League (NSWRL) competition and for Salford in England.

Background
Shaw played junior rugby league for Wellington in the New South Wales country competition before signing with Manly.

Playing career
Shaw made his first grade debut for Manly against South Sydney in Round 12 1986 at Brookvale Oval. Shaw mainly played from the bench in 1986 and 1987 as an understudy to Des Hasler.

Shaw played 12 times for Manly in 1987 as the club reached the grand final against the Canberra Raiders. Manly-Warringah went on to win the premiership 18-8 after leading for the entire match with Shaw coming off the bench. The grand final was also the last one to be played at the Sydney Cricket Ground.

In 1988, Shaw signed with English club Salford and played with them during the off season in Australia. Shaw was man of the match in Salford's Lancashire Cup win.  In 1990, Shaw signed with the Gold Coast Seagulls becoming a regular starter in a struggling side. Shaw's final season at the Gold Coast in 1991 ended with the club finishing last on the table and claiming the wooden spoon. Shaw played 14 games during that season which were all losses.

In 1994, Shaw returned to first grade rugby league in 1994 and played in one game for Manly against the Parramatta Eels. This would be his final game before retiring. In 1996 Shaw played for the Aboriginal team in the World Rugby League Sevens Tournament.

References

1965 births
Australian rugby league players
Indigenous Australian rugby league players
Manly Warringah Sea Eagles players
Gold Coast Chargers players
Salford Red Devils players
Rugby league halfbacks
Living people